Clifton is a village in Worcestershire, England.

Villages in Worcestershire